Naeem Sadiq is an Indian-based neurologist. He is the Medical Director at Plexus Neuro and Stem Cell Research Center.

Education and career
Sadiq holds an MBBS degree from Gulbarga University in 1988. He also obtained a Ph.D degree in  Neurology from University of Colombo.

Sadiq has been practising in the field of neurology for decades. He worked at NIMHANS and did his PG in neurosciences. He also worked as a senior research officer at Nimhans. Sadiq was instrumental in initiating a Neurology unit and Neurology and Neurophysiology unit at AlNour Hospital, Saudi Arabia.

Since 2011, Sadiq has been the Chief Neurologist and Managing Director at Plexus Neuro & Stem Cell Research Centre, Bangalore. He is a member of Indian Medical Association (IMA) and Karnataka Medical Council.

Awards and recognition
 2019 - Signature Healthcare Personality of the Year
 2018 - Iconic Achiever's Award
 2018 - The most trusted stem cell specialist of the year 2018, presented by Bollywood actor,  Sunil Shetty at National Icon Awards
 2017 -  The Leader of Neuro and Stem Cell Therapy in India by Karishma Kapoor
 2017 -  The Leader of Neuro and Stem Cell Therapy in India, awarded at the Rising Leadership Awards in 2017

References

External links
 Plexus Neuro and Stem Cell Research Centre Website

Living people
Indian neurologists
Indian neurosurgeons
Indian medical administrators
Year of birth missing (living people)